The women's 800 metres at the 2011 European Athletics U23 Championships were held at the Městský stadion on 14 and 15 July.

On 30 April 2013, it was announced that the winner of the gold medal, Elena Arzhakova had been suspended for two years from January 2013 for a doping violation, and was to be stripped of all results gained since July 11, 2011.

Medalists

Before reclassification under IAAF antidoping rules

Schedule

Results

Heats
Qualification: First 3 in each heat (Q) and 2 best performers (q) advance to the Final.

Final

Participation
According to an unofficial count, 14 athletes from 10 countries participated in the event.

References 

800 M
800 metres at the European Athletics U23 Championships
2011 in women's athletics